The 2020 Sunoco 159 was the 12th stock car race of the 2020 NASCAR Gander RV & Outdoors Truck Series season and the inaugural running of the event, after the scheduled race, the M&M's 200 at Iowa Speedway, had to be replaced due to the COVID-19 pandemic. The race was held on Sunday, August 16, 2020 in Daytona Beach, Florida at the Daytona International Speedway road course, a  permanent road course. The race was extended from the scheduled 44 laps to 46 laps due to a NASCAR overtime finish. At race's end, Sheldon Creed of GMS Racing would pull away on the final restart to win the race, the 2nd NASCAR Gander RV & Outdoors Truck Series win of his career and the 2nd of the season. To fill the podium, Brett Moffitt of GMS Racing and Austin Hill of Hattori Racing Enterprises would finish 2nd and 3rd, respectively.

On July 30, it was revealed after simulation testing revealed concerns of high speeds entering turn 1 (a turn already considered to be difficult among road racers), a temporary chicane was added in between the 4th turn of the oval and the entrance to pit road (similar to the Charlotte ROVAL). NASCAR further announced that it would use the high-downforce aero package used for the road course races in 2019 (in 2020, road courses were scheduled to use a low-downforce package similar to what was used in 2018 and what is used on ovals 1-mile or shorter in 2020). The addition of the chicane increased the length of the course from 3.56 to 3.61 miles and added a 13th and 14th turn to the original 12-turn layout.

Background

Entry list

Starting lineup 
A new metric qualifying system was placed starting for the Daytona Road Course weekend. To determine the spots, new performance metrics would be weighted and averaged to determine a score. The metrics would be 50% on the finishing position from last race, 35% on team owner's points, and 15% on the fastest lap. As a result, Zane Smith of GMS Racing would win the pole.

Race results 
Stage 1 Laps: 12

Stage 2 Laps: 13

Stage 3 Laps: 21

References 

NASCAR races at Daytona International Speedway
2020 NASCAR Gander RV & Outdoors Truck Series
August 2020 sports events in the United States
2020 in sports in Florida